is a Japanese politician. Ishiba is a member of the Liberal Democratic Party (LDP), and is the leader of the Suigetsukai party faction, and a member of the Heisei Kenkyūkai faction, which was then led by Fukushiro Nukaga, until 2011.

Ishiba served as Director General of the Japan Defense Agency under Prime Minister Junichiro Koizumi from 2002 to 2004. He was Minister of Defense under Yasuo Fukuda from 2007 to 2008 and Minister of Agriculture, Forestry and Fisheries under Tarō Asō from 2008 to 2009. The LDP lost government in 2009, entering Opposition.

In 2012, he sought to challenge Opposition Leader Sadakazu Tanigaki for the presidency of the LDP, but was defeated by former Prime Minister Shinzō Abe. He accepted the position of Secretary-General of the LDP on 27 September 2012. From 3 September 2014 to 3 August 2016, he served in cabinet as minister overseeing regional economic revitalization and policies aimed at reversing population decline.

Early life
Ishiba is a native of Yazu District, Tottori. His father Jirō Ishiba was a politician and government official who served as Minister for Home Affairs, Vice-Minister of Construction, Governor of Tottori Prefecture, and a member of the House of Councillors; his mother was an educator. After his father became the Governor of Tottori Prefecture in 1958, the family moved from Tokyo to Tottori; Ishiba has no memory of living in Tokyo. After graduating from Tottori University Junior High School, he studied at Keio Senior High School.

Ishiba studied law at Keio University, graduating in 1979. He entered Mitsui Bank the same year after graduation. He left the bank after his father's sudden death in 1983.

Political career

In 1983, Ishiba began his political career by working at the secretariat of the Thursday Club, one of the factions in the Liberal Democratic Party. In 1985, at the age of 28, he was elected to the House of Representatives as the youngest member in Japanese history.

Ishiba was appointed as the Minister of Defense to the cabinet of Prime Minister Yasuo Fukuda on 26 September 2007, serving in that post until 1 August 2008. Ishiba was the second person in the cabinet of Fukuda to express belief in the existence of UFOs after Nobutaka Machimura. To that end he appeared on a Japanese TV program which featured dubbed extracts from the National Geographic Channel's Alien Invasion series in June 2012.

Following Fukuda's resignation, Ishiba stood as a candidate for the LDP presidency. In the leadership election, held on 22 September 2008, Tarō Asō won with 351 of the 527 votes; Ishiba placed fifth and last with 25 votes. In Aso's Cabinet, appointed on 24 September 2008, Ishiba was named as Minister of Agriculture, Forestry and Fisheries.

In 2012, while the LDP was still in opposition, Ishiba again stood for the presidency of the LDP and was narrowly defeated by Shinzō Abe. He accepted the position of secretary general on 27 September 2012. Abe re-appointed him to the position after the December 2012 election in which the LDP returned to government.

He attracted considerable criticism for his statement in November 2013 that likened peaceful public protests against the new secrecy bill being introduced by his government to "acts of terrorism". He later withdrew the comment.

In the September 2014 cabinet reshuffle, Abe moved Ishiba from his position as LDP Secretary General and appointed him to a newly created office of Minister for Overcoming Population Decline and Vitalizing Local Economy. He was reported to have declined the offer of a cabinet post responsible for the government's upcoming security legislation.

In spite of having been a vocal critic of factionalism in the LDP, Ishiba launched his own faction, the Suigetsukai, on 28 September 2015, with the aim of succeeding sitting prime minister, Shinzo Abe. However, with 19 members, excluding Ishiba, it was one member short of the 20 votes required for nomination for LDP leadership.

In 2020, following Shinzo Abe's resignation, Ishiba ran for the leadership of the Liberal Democratic Party, losing to Yoshihide Suga, placing third overall. Ishiba declined to run in the 2021 Liberal Democratic Party leadership election, instead endorsing Taro Kono.

Ishiba is affiliated to the openly nationalist organization Nippon Kaigi.

Interest in military issues
Ishiba is known as a "gunji otaku" (military geek) and has a keen interest in military matters. He is known for having a lot of expertise related to weapons systems, legal issues about defense and is also fond of building and painting models of aircraft and ships.

Ishiba has repeatedly stated that he believes that Japan needs its own equivalent of the United States Marine Corps to be able to defend its many small islands, in 2010 when he was policy chief for the LDP in opposition, and as secretary-general of the party in March 2013 after the LDP regained government.

In 2011, Ishiba backed the idea of Japan maintaining the capability of building nuclear weapons:

During the 2013 North Korean crisis, Ishiba stated that Japan had the right to deliver a preemptive strike against North Korea.

In 2017, Ishiba reiterated that Japan should have the capability to build nuclear weapons, stating that "Japan should have the technology to build a nuclear weapon if it wants to do so".

Personal life 
Ishiba is a Protestant Christian. He was baptised at the age of 18 in the Tottori Church of the United Church of Christ in Japan. In recent years he has attended the Evangelical CBMC's National Prayer Breakfast. He also visits the Buddhist graves of his ancestors and worships at the shinto shrine.

Ishiba is known as a "Otaku" for military, vehicles, trains and Japanese idol. He made headlines when he allowed a Japan Self-Defence Forces' vehicle to be displayed at the Shizuoka Hobby Show, a trade fair for plastic and radio-controlled models. When the Russian Defence Minister visited Japan, he stayed up all night assembling a plastic model of the "Admiral Kuznetsov".

Electoral record

Gallery

References

External links 
  
 石破茂-アゴラ
 石破茂（いしばしげる）ブログ
 
 
 
 

1957 births
Living people
Politicians from Tottori Prefecture
Japanese defense ministers
Ministers of Agriculture, Forestry and Fisheries of Japan
Members of the House of Representatives (Japan)
Members of the United Church of Christ in Japan
Liberal Democratic Party (Japan) politicians
Members of Nippon Kaigi
Keio University alumni
21st-century Japanese politicians